On October 28, 1990, regional elections were held in the German-speaking Community of Belgium, to choose representatives for the Council of the German-speaking Community. Elections for the Flemish Council and the Walloon Council were not held until 1995.

Council of the German-speaking Community

1990
1990 elections in Belgium
October 1990 events in Europe